Dalton is a ward of Huddersfield in the metropolitan borough of Kirklees, West Yorkshire, England.   It contains 44 listed buildings that are recorded in the National Heritage List for England.  All the listed buildings are designated at Grade II, the lowest of the three grades, which is applied to "buildings of national importance and special interest".  The ward is to the east and the northeast of the centre of Huddersfield.  The southern part of the ward is mainly residential, the eastern part is mainly industrial, and to the west and north are areas of countryside.  The Huddersfield Broad Canal runs along the eastern part, and the listed buildings associated with it are locks, bridges and a warehouse.  Most of the listed buildings in the residential parts are houses, cottages, shops and associated structures, and in the countryside they are farmhouses and farm buildings.  The other listed buildings include churches and related structures, the remains of a hypocaust and a former cloth hall re-erected in a park, a road bridge, mill buildings and a mill chimney.


Buildings

References

Citations

Sources

Lists of listed buildings in West Yorkshire
Buildings and structures in Huddersfield